The Kuangyuan Series is a Late Jurassic (Oxfordian-?Tithonian) geologic formation in Sichuan (Szechuan), China. Dinosaur remains are among the fossils that have been recovered from the formation.

Paleofauna
 Chienkosaurus ceratosauroides - "Isolated teeth."
 Sanpasaurus yaoi - "Fragmentary postcranium."
 ?Szechuanosaurus campi - "Teeth from multiple specimens"
 Sinocoelurus fragilis - "Isolated teeth."

See also

 List of dinosaur-bearing rock formations
 List of stratigraphic units with indeterminate dinosaur fossils

Footnotes

References
 Weishampel, David B.; Dodson, Peter; and Osmólska, Halszka (eds.): The Dinosauria, 2nd, Berkeley: University of California Press. 861 pp. .

Mesozoic Erathem of Asia